Kalmar Nation may refer to:
 Kalmar Nation, Lund
 Kalmar nation, Uppsala